Justin Hurwitz is an American film composer and a television writer. He is best known for his longtime collaboration with director Damien Chazelle, scoring each of his films: Guy and Madeline on a Park Bench (2009), Whiplash (2014), La La Land (2016), First Man (2018), and Babylon (2022).

For La La Land, Hurwitz won two Academy Awards, Best Original Score and Best Original Song (for "City of Stars"), as well as the Golden Globe Awards for Best Original Score and Best Original Song and the BAFTA Award for Best Film Music. He won two more Golden Globes for Best Original Score for First Man and Babylon.

Early life 
Hurwitz is the son of Gail (née Halabe), a professional ballet dancer turned registered nurse, and Ken Hurwitz, a writer. He is of Jewish heritage (from Russia, Poland, Damascus in Syria, and Beirut in Lebanon). His family moved to Wisconsin in 1998 where he attended Nicolet High School.

Hurwitz attended Harvard University, where he was roommates with director Damien Chazelle. They collaborated on a student film that would become Guy and Madeline on a Park Bench, which was released in 2009. While in school, Hurwitz was a member of the Harvard Lampoon and was an original member of the indie-pop band Chester French with Chazelle.

Career 
After college, Hurwitz and Chazelle moved to Los Angeles where Hurwitz wrote comedy for the sitcom The League and one episode of the animated comedy TV series The Simpsons. Thanks to the success of Guy and Madeline, they were able to obtain financing for their next collaboration, the 2014 film Whiplash – with Hurwitz scoring the film and Chazelle writing and directing. Hurwitz also scored Chazelle's 2016 film La La Land, for which Chazelle won the Oscar for Best Director and Hurwitz won two Oscars for Best Original Score and Best Original Song. He and Pasek and Paul will return as songwriters for the upcoming stage musical adaptation of the film, directed by Bartlett Sher from a book by Ayad Akhtar and Matthew Decker, with Marc Platt and Lionsgate returning to produce.

Filmography

Films

Television

Awards and nominations

References

External links
 

Living people
21st-century American composers
21st-century American male musicians
American film score composers
American male television writers
American people of Lebanese-Jewish descent
American people of Russian-Jewish descent
American television producers
American television writers
Best Original Music BAFTA Award winners
Best Original Music Score Academy Award winners
Best Original Song Academy Award-winning songwriters
Golden Globe Award-winning musicians
Grammy Award winners
The Harvard Lampoon alumni
Jewish American film score composers
American male film score composers
21st-century American Jews
Year of birth missing (living people)